Himachal Pradesh was under the direct control of the British colonial rule in the mid 19th century. Also, the state was the summer capital of India during the British colonial rule. Hence, the standard of education provided in the state has reached to a considerably high level. The state has several highly reputed educational institutions for higher studies.
The Indian Institute of Technology Mandi, Himachal Pradesh University (HPU), Indian Institute of Management Sirmaur and NIT Hamirpur are some of the pioneer institutions located in the state. The University Grants Commission (UGC) has allocated Rs 45 million to Himachal Pradesh University in the 10th plan which is an increase of nearly 70% over the ninth one.
Dr. Yashwant Singh Parmar University of Horticulture and Forestry has gained a unique distinction not only in the nation but also in whole of Asia for imparting teaching, research and extension education in horticulture, forestry and allied disciplines.
All india institute of medical sciences is established in bilaspur district in hp Indra Gandhi medical College shimla is one is most premium institute in medical sciences in North India

The government is working constantly to prepare various plans to strengthen the education system of Himachal. The state government has decided to start up with 3 major nursing colleges to develop the health system in the state.

Himachal has one of the highest literacy rates in India. Hamirpur District is among the top districts in the country for literacy. Education rates among women are quite encouraging in the state.
Himachal Pradesh is home to many educational institutions offering a wide variety of courses. There are five universities, eight medical colleges, five dental colleges and two engineering colleges in the state. There are over 10,000 primary schools, 1,000 secondary schools and more than 1,300 high schools in Himachal. Hindi and English are compulsory languages in schools whereas Punjabi, Sanskrit, Tamil, Telugu and Urdu are chosen as optional languages.

In meeting the constitutional obligation to make primary education compulsory, Himachal has now become the first state in India to make elementary education accessible to every child in the state.
Himachal Pradesh government is also very keen to transform this state into an education hub.
In March 2008, Government of India made an announcement stating that as part of the 11th five-year plan, an Indian Institute of Technology will be established in this state. Further, Atal Bihari Vajpayee Government Engineering and Technology Institute has been started at Pragatinagar, in Shimla district. This college will have engineering related courses such as ITI, Diploma and Degree all in same campus.

Educational Institutes
 Solan Homoeopathic Medical College & Hospital, Kumarhatti, Solan district
Career Point University, Hamirpur
Indian Institute of Management Sirmaur
 Alakh Prakash Goyal University
 Indian Institute of Information Technology Una 
 Himachal Pradesh National Law University
 Dr. Yashwant Singh Parmar University of Horticulture and Forestry
 Green Hills Engineering College
 Himachal Pradesh University
 IITT college of Engineering
 Indian Institute of Advanced Study
 Baddi University of Emerging Sciences and  Technology
 Maharaja Agrasen University, Himachal Pradesh
 National Institute of Technology, Hamirpur
 Jaypee University of Information Technology
 Chitkara University, Himachal Pradesh
 University Institute of Information Technology (UIIT)

Engineering institutions

The state of Himachal Pradesh is a late starter in establishing engineering institutes as compared to other states of India. National Institute of Technology, Hamirpur (then Regional Engineering College, Hamirpur) was the first institute established in 1986. IITT college of Engineering, Kala Amb was the second institute established in the 20th century. The remaining institutes were established in the 21st century. A Government engineering school namely, Jawaharlal Nehru Government Engineering College in Sundernagar, was established by state govt in 2006. Needless to say that none of these institutions have achieved academic maturity as yet. Though some institutions (notably National Institute of Technology, Hamirpur) are striving hard to be centers of excellence, however the results are not encouraging. People of Himachal Pradesh nurture a desire to make this state a Switzerland of India because both share similar topography, however Himachal Pradesh lacks Swiss industrial prowess at present. It is hoped that manpower trained at these institutions shall support the industries in the region and some budding entrepreneurs will emerge to transform the industrial landscape of the state.

Educational institutions (non-governmental)
Himachal Pradesh is home to several non-governmental organisations (NGO) operating educational institutes in the state. 
Deer Park Institute offers educational courses and seminars in classical Indian wisdom traditions.
Dharmalaya Institute provides education and vocational training in vernacular earthen architecture in the traditional Kangra style, as well as service-learning courses in sustainable living and immersive ecotourism programs.
 NISHTHA is a charitable trust working for the benefit and development of society as a whole by improving the welfare of families with particular focus on women and children, through activities in the fields of health, education and environment.
 Shantideva Homeopathic Research Institute (SHRI) runs educational programs to increase awareness of healthy lifestyles, offering free clinics and seminars for the rural population of Himachal Pradesh.
Dr Puran Chand Medical Charitable Trust (Regd) runs a number of Institutions in the State – Himachal Dental College, Sundernagar (District Mandi), Himachal Institute of Dental Sciences, Himachal Institute of Technology, Himachal Institute of Nursing, Himachal Institute of Life Sciences, and Himachal Institute of Pharmacy all at Paonta Sahib (District Sirmaur)

References

See also
 List of educational institutions in Himachal Pradesh